Hendrick Hendricksen Kip (1600–1685) was a Dutch colonial magistrate. He was one of the nine original popular assemblymen serving in New Amsterdam from 1647 under Pieter Stuyvesant, Governor of New Netherlands.

Biography
Hendrick Hendricksen Kip was a tailor in Amsterdam in 1624. He came to America about 1637 with his wife and five children, as on the map of New Netherlands of 1639 he is recorded as owning one of the Plantations.

In 1647 he was chosen as one of the first Board of "Nine Men" to act as Governing Tribunal for New Amsterdam, and held office again in 1649 and 1650. He was appointed a Grand Schepen (alderman, or magistrate) on Feb. 2, 1656, and on April 11, 1657 he was admitted to the Rights of a Great Burgher, and so took an important part in the government of New Amsterdam. After New Amsterdam was surrendered, he took the Oath of Allegiance to the English in October 1664.

His will (found in the Kip Family papers, New York Public Library) apparently was never officially recorded. It was drawn by notary Willem Bogardus. Since both will and accounting cite the notary, it seems likely that Bogardus, who was city treasurer 1680-85 and later postmaster of New York province, entrusted the papers to Hendrick's son Jacob, especially since Jacob, who served five terms as city schepen, aided in administering the estate.  His 7800 guilder estate was a substantial one for that time period. Will dated Feb. 2, 1671; Codicil dated Aug. 4, 1680; Estate accounting March 8, 1686.

Sons
Kip had six children, notably:
Isaac Hendricksen Kip (1627–1678) 
Descendants settled in Rhinebeck, New York.
Jacobus Hendricksen Kip (1631–1690)
Married Henrica Vanplanck, widow of Guilian Vanplanck; was a partner with Francis Rombouts and Stephanus Van Cortlandt in the Rombout Patent in Dutchess County, New York. Descendants settled in Kip's Bay, Manhattan, and Westchester County, New York.  
Hendrick Hendricksen Kip, Jr (1633–1670)
Settled at New Amstel on the Delaware River and then at Midwout, Midwood (Flatbush), Long Island.

Legacy
 Isaac Hendricksen Kip had a son, Jacobus. However, Verplanck died in 1684 and his widow Henrika married Jacobus Kip, and the family's share of the patent passed down through that line.
 Hendrick Hendricksen Kip is mentioned in Washington Irving's 1809 satirical history The Knickerbocker's History of New York in the following (ahistorical) anecdote.

[A group of Dutch settlers were sailing down the East River in a small boat:] "While the voyagers were looking around them, on what they conceived to be a serene and sunny lake, they beheld at a distance a crew of painted savages busily employed in fishing, who seemed more like the genii of this romantic region -- their slender canoe lightly balanced like a feather on the undulating surface of the bay. At sight of these, the hearts of the heroes on Communipaw were not a little troubled. But as good fortune would have it, at the bow of the commodore's boat was stationed a very valiant man named Hendrick Kip (which, being interpreted, means chicken; a name given him on token of his courage). No sooner did he behold those varlet heathens than he trembled with excessive valor, and, although a good half mile distant, he seized a musketoon that lay at hand, and turning away his head, fired it most intrepidly in the face of the blessed sun. The blundering weapon recoiled and gave the valiant Kip an ignominious kick that laid him prostrate with uplifted heels in the bottom of the boat. But such was the effect of this tremendous fire that the wild men of the woods, struck with consternation, seized hastily upon their paddles, and shot away into one of the deep inlets of the Long Island shore. This signal victory gave new spirits to the hardy voyagers, and in honor of the achievement they gave the name of the valiant Kip to the surrounding bay, and it has continued to be called "Kip's Bay" from that time to the present."

 He is mentioned among other contemporary historical figures in Edmund Clarence Stedman's poem "The Dutch Patrol" as "Hendrick Kip of the haughty lip".
 Kip's Bay on midtown Manhattan's East Side is named for his son, Hendricksen Kip, who established a house and farm there in 1655.

References

Citations

Other sources
History of The Kip Family In America,  by Frederic E. Kip and Margarita L. Hawley, 1928.  No. 1, p. 19.

Contributions to the History of the Kip Family of New York and New Jersey, by Edwin R. Purple, 1877.

How Hendrick Kip Bequeathed His Estate. de Halve Maen, Vol. XXXVII, No. 3, Oct, 1962. p. 9, 10, 12. Translation of document(s) from the "Kip Family Papers."

Kip Family Papers, 1664-1845. 22 items (1 box, 1 folder). New York Public Library, Humanities - Manuscripts & Archives. MssCol 1651.

Preakness and the Preakness Reformed Church, Passaic County, New Jersey. A History 1695-1902, with Genealogical Notes, the Records of the Church and Tombstone Inscriptions, by George Warne Labaw, New York, 1902.

The Register of New Netherland 1626 to 1674. By E.B. O'Callaghan. Clearfield Co., Baltimore, MD. 1995.

Pre-Revolutionary Dutch Houses and Families, in Northern New Jersey and Southern New York. By Rosalie Fellows Bailey. TheHolland Society of New York. William Morrow & Co., New York, 1936.

Calendar of Dutch Historical Manuscripts in the Office of the Secretary of State Albany, New York 1630-1664, by Edmund B. O'Callaghan, The Gregg Press, Ridgewood, NJ, 1968.

P. 91. Council Minutes, Vol. IV, p. 203.  Sept. 29, 1644. Court Proceedings. William de Key vs. Hendrick Kip, slander; ordered that defendant's wife appear next Thursday and acknowledge in court, that whay she stated to the prejudice of the plaintiff is false, and not repeat the offense on pain of severer punishment.

P. 97. Council Minutes, Vol. IV, p. 232. Aug. 30, 1645. Order. To the court messenger to notify all inhabitants to assemble at the fort ......; the court messange reports that all the citizens on the Manhattans, "from the highest to the lowest," will attend, as they all answered kindly, except one Hendrick Kip, a tailor.

P. 106.  Council Minutes, Vol. IV, p. 278, 9. Dec. 17, 1646. Court Proceedings. Fiscal vs. Hendrick Kip's wife, for calling the director and council false judges, and the fiscal a forsworn fiscal; Hendrick Kip states that his wife has been upset, and so out of health ever since Maryn Adriaensen's attempt to murder the director-general, that when disturbed in the least, she knows not what she does; Mrs. Kip denies the charge; parties ordered to produce evidence on both sides.

P. 373. Land Papers, Vol. G.G., p. 187. March 14, 1647. Patent. Abraham Planck; lot between Hendrick Kip and Peter van der Linden, Manhattan island.

P. 54. Register of Provincial Secretary, Vol. III, p. 92. Aug. 29, 1651. Deed. Hendrick Kip to Albert Andriessen, of a house and lot on Manhattan island, northeast of fort Amsterdam.

P. 60. Register of Provincial Secretary, Vol. III, p. 142. July 27, 1658. Deed. Hendrick Hendricksen Kip to Caspar Stymensen, of a lot south side of Brewer Street, New Amsterdam.

American people of Dutch descent
People of New Netherland
Place of birth missing
1600 births
1685 deaths